On September 21, 2016, a boat capsized off the Egyptian coast with around 600 refugees on board in the Mediterranean Sea. 204 bodies were recovered (including at least 30 children), around 160 people were rescued, and hundreds of people remain missing, with approximately 300 people presumed dead. Four people were arrested for trafficking and breaking capacity laws. The incident was the worst in 2016 in the Mediterranean Sea.

Reactions
An Egyptian Member of Parliament named Elhamy Agina reacted to the incident by stating that the victims of the disaster "deserved to die" and "do not deserve sympathy", causing controversy after an emergency cabinet meeting between President Abdel Fattah al-Sisi and Egypt's security chiefs.

See also
 Timeline of the European migrant crisis
 Ghost boat investigation

References

2016 in Egypt
Migrant shipwreck
Maritime incidents in Egypt
September 2016 events in Egypt
Transport disasters involving refugees of the Arab Winter (2011–present)

Migrant boat disasters in the Mediterranean Sea